Garhi Khairo is a Town and  Tehsil in Jacobabad District Sindh. According to 2017 Census population of Garhi Khairo is 158360, Garhi Khairo  is connected with Jacobabad, Shikarpur, Qambar, It also shares Sindh border with Balochistan from Usta Muhammad side.

Notable people

 Saira Shahliani, Pakistani Politician and Member of the Provisional Assembly of Sindh from 2013 - 2018

See also
 Garhi Khairo railway station
 Shahdadkot
 Umeed Ali Junejo
 Jacobabad District

References
 Garhi Khairo Map
 Population of Garhi Khairo

Populated places in Jacobabad District
Talukas of Sindh